Northlake is a census-designated place (CDP) in Anderson County, South Carolina, United States. The population was 3,745 at the 2010 census.

Geography
Northlake is a suburban area located in central Anderson County at  (34.562912, -82.690145), bordering the north side of Anderson, the county seat. The CDP on both sides of an arm of Lake Hartwell, a large reservoir and recreation area. Interstate 85 forms the northern boundary of the CDP, leading northeast  to Greenville and southwest  to Atlanta. Exits 19 (U.S. Route 76) and 21 (U.S. Route 178) serve the community.

Darwin Wright Park, a City of Anderson recreation area, provides access within the CDP to Lake Hartwell on its arm formed by Six and Twenty Creek.

Demographics

2020 census

As of the 2020 United States census, there were 3,818 people, 1,530 households, and 1,085 families residing in the CDP.

2000 census
As of the census of 2000, there were 3,659 people, 1,611 households, and 1,089 families residing in the CDP. The population density was 862.7 people per square mile (333.2/km2). There were 1,775 housing units at an average density of 418.5/sq mi (161.6/km2). The racial makeup of the CDP was 90.90% White, 6.81% African American, 0.16% Native American, 1.28% Asian, 0.16% from other races, and 0.68% from two or more races. Hispanic or Latino of any race were 0.52% of the population.

There were 1,611 households, out of which 24.6% had children under the age of 18 living with them, 59.7% were married couples living together, 5.5% had a female householder with no husband present, and 32.4% were non-families. 28.5% of all households were made up of individuals, and 7.7% had someone living alone who was 65 years of age or older. The average household size was 2.26 and the average family size was 2.78.

In the CDP, the population was spread out, with 19.9% under the age of 18, 7.8% from 18 to 24, 28.3% from 25 to 44, 28.5% from 45 to 64, and 15.5% who were 65 years of age or older. The median age was 41 years. For every 100 females, there were 97.5 males. For every 100 females age 18 and over, there were 97.1 males.

The median income for a household in the CDP was $51,371, and the median income for a family was $62,415. Males had a median income of $44,236 versus $30,125 for females. The per capita income for the CDP was $28,912. About 1.4% of families and 3.2% of the population were below the poverty line, including 1.5% of those under age 18 and 4.7% of those age 65 or over.

References

Census-designated places in Anderson County, South Carolina
Census-designated places in South Carolina